Macleay's dorcopsis (Dorcopsulus macleayi), also known as the Papuan dorcopsis or the Papuan forest wallaby, is a species of marsupial in the family Macropodidae. It is endemic to Papua New Guinea, where its natural habitat is subtropical or  tropical dry forest]. Being little threatened by habitat destruction, the International Union for Conservation of Nature has rated it as being of "least concern".

Taxonomy
Macleay's dorcopsis was first described by the Russian biologist Nicholas Miklouho-Maclay who named it Dorcopsulus macleayi in honour of the Australian naturalist William John Macleay. It is the type species of the genus. Some authorities consider it to be the same species as the small dorcopsis (Dorcopsulus vanheurni), which has a much wider distribution in New Guinea, but Groves (2005) supports its status as a separate species.

Description
It differs from D. vanheurni in having about two-thirds to three-quarters of its tail covered with fur, compared to one half in D. vanheurni.

Distribution
Macleay's dorcopsis is endemic to the southeastern part of the island of New Guinea. It is found in hilly areas and lower montane slopes at altitudes of between  where it occurs in both primary and secondary tropical moist forest.

Status
At one time considered to be a "vulnerable species", D. macleayi is now listed by the International Union for Conservation of Nature as being of "least concern"; the area where it lives is inaccessible and largely undisturbed, it is a common species and no particular threats have been identified. The indigenous people hunt this species for food to a limited extent, but not to such a degree as to warrant placing it in a more threatened category.

References

Macropods
Mammals of Papua New Guinea
Mammals described in 1885
Taxonomy articles created by Polbot
Marsupials of New Guinea